Laminin subunit beta-1 is a protein that in humans is encoded by the LAMB1 gene.

Laminins, a family of extracellular matrix glycoproteins, are the major noncollagenous constituent of basement membranes.  They have been implicated in a wide variety of biological processes including cell adhesion, differentiation, migration, signaling, neurite outgrowth and metastasis.  Laminins are composed of 3 non identical chains: laminin alpha, beta and gamma (formerly A, B1, and B2, respectively) and they form a cruciform structure consisting of 3 short arms, each formed by a different chain, and a long arm composed of all 3 chains.  Each laminin chain is a multidomain protein encoded by a distinct gene.  Several isoforms of each chain have been described.  Different alpha, beta and gamma chain isomers combine to give rise to different heterotrimeric laminin isoforms, which are designated by Arabic numerals in the order of their discovery, i.e. alpha1beta1gamma1 heterotrimer is laminin 1.  The biological functions of the different chains and trimer molecules are largely unknown, but some of the chains have been shown to differ with respect to their tissue distribution, presumably reflecting diverse functions in vivo.  This gene encodes the beta chain isoform laminin, beta 1.  The beta 1 chain has 7 structurally distinct domains, which it shares with other beta chain isomers.  The C-terminal helical region containing domains I and II are separated by domain alpha, domains III and V contain several EGF-like repeats, and domains IV and VI have a globular conformation.  Laminin, beta 1 is expressed in most tissues that produce basement membranes, and is one of the 3 chains constituting laminin 1, the first laminin isolated from Engelbreth-Holm-Swarm (EHS) tumor.  A sequence in the beta 1 chain that is involved in cell attachment, chemotaxis, and binding to the laminin receptor was identified and shown to have the capacity to inhibit metastasis.

5′-UTR of Laminin-B1 harbors IRES (internal ribosome entry site) between −293 and −1 upstream of the start codon. IRES are involved in cancer malignancy.

References

Further reading

Laminins